Juliet Jean Campbell (born 17 March 1970 in Kingston) is a retired Jamaican sprinter, who specialized in the 200 and 400 metres. She also competed on the successful Jamaican team in both 4 × 100 m and 4 × 400 m relay.

Achievements

Personal bests
200 metres - 22.50 s (1999)
400 metres - 50.11 s (1996)

References

External links
 
 
 

1970 births
Living people
Jamaican female sprinters
Sportspeople from Kingston, Jamaica
Athletes (track and field) at the 1992 Summer Olympics
Athletes (track and field) at the 1996 Summer Olympics
Athletes (track and field) at the 2000 Summer Olympics
Athletes (track and field) at the 1998 Commonwealth Games
Athletes (track and field) at the 2002 Commonwealth Games
Olympic athletes of Jamaica
World Athletics Championships medalists
Commonwealth Games medallists in athletics
Commonwealth Games silver medallists for Jamaica
Goodwill Games medalists in athletics
World Athletics Indoor Championships medalists
World Athletics Indoor Championships winners
Competitors at the 2001 Goodwill Games
Olympic female sprinters
20th-century Jamaican women
21st-century Jamaican women
Medallists at the 1998 Commonwealth Games
Medallists at the 2002 Commonwealth Games